Atuabo is a town in the Western Region of Ghana noted for the situation of the Ghana Gas Company's Atuabo Gas Plant and the proposed Atuabo Freeport

References

Populated places in the Western Region (Ghana)